Ben McCashney (born 26 October 1988 in Trentham, Victoria) is an Australian racing driver.

McCashney's career started at the early age of three, racing at his father's go-kart centre. Ten state championships came with his karting career. McCashney went on to race a Mitsubishi Mirage in Improved Production in 2005.

In 2006, he moved into the Aussie Racing Cars series, finishing runner up in 2007 before moving to the V8 Supercar development series in 2009, driving an Image Racing BA Falcon. In 2010 McCashney competed for his own team, Ben McCashney Racing, driving a Paul Morris prepared VZ Commodore.

Ben McCashney Racing
Ben McCashney Racing is the team name that McCashney has raced under during most of his career. The team is based in Kyneton, Victoria.

Career results

References

External links
 Ben McCashney Racing website

1988 births
Racing drivers from Victoria (Australia)
Supercars Championship drivers
Living people